Gustavo Ollo (born 22 October 1963) is an Argentine boxer. He competed in the men's light middleweight event at the 1984 Summer Olympics.

References

External links
 

1963 births
Living people
Argentine male boxers
Olympic boxers of Argentina
Boxers at the 1984 Summer Olympics
Place of birth missing (living people)
Light-middleweight boxers